Nathan Burrage is an Australian writer of speculative fiction.

Born 1971, in country Victoria, Australia, Burrage grew up in Melbourne. He graduated with a Bachelor of Economics & Commerce from the University of Melbourne in 1993.

He began writing fiction in the late 1990s, with his first short story was published in 2001. In that year Burrage was awarded a mentorship by the NSW Writers’ Centre to develop an early version of his debut novel, FIVEFOLD. Since then, he has had 20 short stories published in various Australian anthologies, magazines and webzines.

In January 2005, Burrage was selected to attend Clarion South, the Australian equivalent of the US residential short story workshop. With the benefit of this experience, he was able to secure a literary agent and FIVEFOLD was sold to Random House Australia in January 2007.

Bibliography – novels 

 FIVEFOLD -  published in January 2008 by / Random House Australia

Bibliography – short stories (selected) 

 2010 - R Quotient (reprint) & In the Arms of Medusa (reprint) - Issue 8, / Orb Speculative Fiction
 2010 - Fragments of the Fractured Forever - Issue 43, / Aurealis Magazine
 2008 - Spirals in the Sky - Issue 40, / Aurealis Magazine
 2008 - Obituary Park - Macabre: A Journey Through Australia's Darkest Fears, / Brimstone Press
 2008 - 7 Kinds of Wrong - Black Box e-anthology, / Brimstone Press
 2008 - Upon Reflection - Black Box e-anthology, / Brimstone Press
 2007 - The Sidpa Bardo (reprint) - Australian Dark Fantasy & Horror 2, / Brimstone Press
 2007 - The 32 Paths - Issue 114, / AntipodeanSF
 2007 - Black & Bitter, Thanks - / Ticonderoga Publications, The Workers' Paradise Anthology
 2007 - In The Arms of Medusa - Issue 7, / Orb Magazine (nominated for a 2007 Aurealis Award).
 2006 - A Skinful of Guilt - Issue 11, / Shadowed Realms
 2006 - The Sidpa Bardo - Issue 10, / Shadowed Realms
 2005 - Blurring - Shadow Box e-anthology, / Brimstone Press
 2004 - The R Quotient - Issue 6, / Orb Magazine
 2001 - A Message to Medicare - Issue 7, / Redsine Magazine
 2001 - Snowstorm - Issue 27/28, / Aurealis Magazine

Awards and nominations

 2009 Ditmar Awards Short-listed for Best Novel
 2008 Aurealis Awards Short-listed for Best Science Fiction story
 2008 Ditmar Awards Short-listed for Best New Talent

References

External links
Official website

1971 births
Living people
21st-century Australian novelists
Australian male novelists
Australian male short story writers
People from Victoria (Australia)
21st-century Australian short story writers
21st-century Australian male writers